"Take My Name" is a song by American country music band Parmalee. It was released on October 4, 2021, as the second single from the band's third studio album For You. The band's lead vocalist Matt Thomas co-wrote the song with Ashley Gorley, Ben Johnson and David Fanning, while it was produced by Fanning.

Background
On July 9, 2021, the band posted a snippet on TikTok, and announced the song had been released early. Robyn Collins of Taste of Country described the song as "a musical marriage proposal". The band's lead vocalist Matt Thomas told Sounds Like Nashville: "'Take My Name' was inspired by my brother Scott getting married last year, It made me sit back and think about what I would want to say to my future wife".

Content
Thomas told American Songwriter: "'Take My Name' is a song about finding the person you want to spend the rest of your life with. A feeling you haven't had before. You don't want to look anywhere else or waste anymore time, you are ready to make that person yours".

Live performance
On October 18, 2021, the band performed the song on The Kelly Clarkson Show.

Charts

Weekly charts

Year-end charts

Release history

References

2021 singles
2021 songs
Parmalee songs
Songs written by Ashley Gorley
Songs written by David Fanning (singer)
BBR Music Group singles
Billboard Country Airplay number-one singles of the year